Alba Rico Navarro is a Spanish actress, singer and model. She is known for playing the role of Naty on the Disney Channel telenovela Violetta.

Career 
Her career started in 2012 with the role of Naty Vidal, on the telenovela Violetta. She played the role on all three seasons.

In 2013, she starred alongside her Violetta costars, in the Violetta en vivo Latin American tour and 2015 in the European Violetta Live tour.

Filmography

Discography 
Soundtracks
2012: Violetta
2012: Cantar es lo que soy
2013: Hoy somos más
2013: Violetta en vivo
2014: Gira mi cancion
2015: Crecimos Juntos

References 

Living people
Spanish actresses
21st-century Spanish women singers
21st-century Spanish singers
Spanish female models
Date of birth missing (living people)
Violetta (TV series)
Year of birth missing (living people)